Paul Jackson (born ) is a former Scotland international rugby league footballer who played as a  or  in the 1990s, 2000s and 2010s. He played at club level for the Huddersfield Giants (two spells), Wakefield Trinity Wildcats, Castleford Tigers (Heritage No. 795) (two spells), Whitehaven and the Dewsbury Rams.

Background
Paul Jackson was born in Leeds, West Yorkshire, England.

Playing career
Paul Jackson played for Huddersfield in the 2006 Challenge Cup Final as a  against St. Helens that Huddersfield lost 12–42.
He was named in the Scotland training squad for the 2008 Rugby League World Cup.

He was named in the Scotland squad for the 2008 Rugby League World Cup.

Jackson rejoined Castleford for the 2010 season. He previously played for the club in 2003 and 2004.

References

External links
Castleford Tigers profile

1978 births
Living people
Castleford Tigers players
Dewsbury Rams players
English people of Scottish descent
English rugby league players
Huddersfield Giants players
Rugby league players from Leeds
Rugby league props
Rugby league second-rows
Scotland national rugby league team players
Wakefield Trinity players
Whitehaven R.L.F.C. players